{{Infobox Boxingmatch
|fight date= July 2, 2011
|Fight Name= The Talk Ends Now
|image= 
|location = Imtech Arena, Altona, Hamburg, Germany
|fighter1=Wladimir Klitschko
|nickname1=Dr. Steelhammer
|record1=55–3 (49 KO)
|hometown1=Kyiv, Kyiv Oblast, Ukraine
|height1 = 6 ft 6 in
|weight1 = 242.6 lbs 
|style1 = Orthodox
|recognition1= IBF, WBO, IBO, and The Ring heavyweight champion[[The Ring (magazine)|The Ring]] No. 5 ranked pound-for-pound fighter
|fighter2=David Haye
|nickname2=The Hayemaker
|record2=25–1 (23 KO)
|hometown2=Lambeth, London, England
|height2 =6 ft 3 in
|weight2 = 212.8 lbs 
|style2 = Orthodox
|recognition2=WBA heavyweight champion2-division world champion
|titles=WBA (Unified), IBF, WBO, IBO, and The Ring heavyweight titles
|result= Klitschko wins via 12-round unanimous decision (117-109, 118-108, 116-110)
}}
Wladimir Klitschko vs. David Haye, billed as The Talk Ends Now, was a heavyweight unification fight between IBF, WBO, IBO, and The Ring champion Wladimir Klitschko, and WBA champion David Haye. The fight took place in Imtech Arena, Altona, Hamburg, Germany on July 2, 2011.Boxing – Klitschko-Haye in Hamburg. Fightnews.com (2011-04-20). Retrieved on 2011-06-17. Klitschko defeated Haye by unanimous decision.

Background
In 2008 after becoming unified cruiserweight champion, David Haye moved up to heavyweight. Klitschko welcomed the challenge of Haye. Talks started immediately between Klitschko and Haye but came to nothing, even after Haye publicly confronted and challenged Klitschko at an event at the ExCeL London in April 2008. Haye reiterated a challenge to Klitschko to fight him in 2009. In his second fight, he wanted to fight JD Chapman who he claimed was a similar style to the Klitschkos. Haye also added that the heavyweight division was scared of him. In July 2008 Wladimir Klitschko said that Haye was a possible opponent for him to fight next. Haye started to call out the Klitschkos after he knocked out Monte Barret in the 5th round in 2008.

In late 2008 Haye and Vitali verbally agreed to terms to fight in the summer. However Klitschko fought mandatory challenger, Juan Carlos Gomez. Haye then turned his sights to Wladimir. In 2009 after protracted talks, Wladimir agreed to fight Haye on 20 June in Gelsenkirchen, Germany. In the build-up to that fight Klitschko labeled Haye an 'embarrassment' after Haye appeared wearing a T-shirt with the Klitschkos' severed heads. He also vowed to knock Haye out in the 12th round. Haye pulled out of the fight with a back injury, and hoped to postpone the fight until July 11. This did not happen and Haye was replaced by Ruslan Chagaev who Klitschko stopped in 9th round. Since then both Vitali and Wladimir had wanted to fight Haye. With Vitali wanting to have a fight with Haye in 2010 which never happened. While Haye won the WBA title after defeating Nikolay Valuev.

Build-up
On 16 April 2009, Haye wore a T-shirt depicting him holding the heads of the Klitschko brothers while standing atop their decapitated bodies.
At the same time, he declared a war on both the Klitschko brothers, hoping to first defeat Wladimir, then Vitali.
Two press conferences were held in announcement of the fight. The first one took place in Hamburg, the second in London.
There was also an HBO Face Off held in New York City.
At both press conferences David Haye refused to shake Klitschko's hand. Klitschko said it was a sign of lack of respect from Haye's side. Haye said that he did not want to shake Klitschko's hand, because "he doesn't want to do what Wladimir tells him to do."
He said that Klitschko is a control freak who has to know and control what his opponents do. Haye promised that he would win by knockout, that the trash talk was over and that it was down to business, which was also one of the reasons why he didn’t bring his infamous T-shirt.
Klitschko asked about the T-shirt and wanted to see it. Haye again referred to Klitschko as a "control freak."Wladimir Klitschko David Haye press conference HAMBURG. YouTube (2011-05-09). Retrieved on 2011-09-18.
Haye said that he intended to shake Klitschko's gloves when they are in the ring together, but only because it was the rules.
At an interview on Sky, Haye also refused to come into the studio with Klitschko because he said he'd had enough of him, he'd seen too much of him – first in New York, then Hamburg and now in London.
At the HBO Face Off, Haye said that you could feel the tension and "almost cut it with a knife". He also thought that Klitschko would punch him during the interview. Yet again Haye refused to shake Klitschko's hand.

A pre-fight news conference was held on June 27 in Hamburg. No new things were said. Haye got up and said that Klitschko was like a robot, and would malfunction on fight night. He said he was happy the fight was happening, because he was just a much better fighter. He also said that he would show a totally new game plan and would not fight like he had done in his other fights. Haye proclaimed that you could play his new iPhone game David Haye's knockout,  where you could see what would happen on July 2.
Haye's trainer Adam Booth got up to the microphone and only said: "Enjoy", and gave the word to Klitschko's trainer Emanuel Steward.
Steward said it was a big fight and he was very happy. He said that he would rate it as the 2nd biggest, only behind Lennox Lewis vs. Mike Tyson.
Klitschko said that he did not like Haye's attitude and that he would give him a lesson. He said he respected him as a fighter but not as a person.
He promised to knock Haye out and that it would be good for Haye as a person.
Vitali Klitschko wanted Haye to promise to be at the post press conference in front of everybody. Haye promised and said that Vitali should promise the same and not go with Wladimir to the ambulance after Haye had knocked him out.
There was a scuffle and some punches between the two teams at the staredown, where Klitschko's manager Bernard Bönte wanted to end the staredown early (the previous occasion, it had lasted almost three minutes).Wladimir Klitschko – David Haye Staredown (Hamburg, 09.05.2011). YouTube (2011-05-09). Retrieved on 2011-09-18.

On 29 June, a public training session was held at a Mercedes Benz showroom in Hamburg, Germany. The two fighters showed off some skills and punches, while Adam Booth made a short parody on Klitschko.Adam Booth parodies Wladimir Klitschko at David Haye Open Workout. YouTube (2011-06-29). Retrieved on 2011-09-18.

The Haye camp protested the choice of Gino Rodriguez as referee for the fight, because Rodriguez had refereed some of Klitschko's other fights (including his loss to Corrie Sanders). The WBA Sanctioning Bodies then voted for the referee, resulting in favour of Rodriguez.

The weigh in took place on 1 July 2011 at Karstadt Sporthaus, Hamburg. Wladimir Klitschko weighed in at 243 lbs (110 kg). David Haye weighed in at 213 lbs (96 kg) 

iPhone game
David Haye released a controversial iPhone game, developed by Grubby Hands. The game allows players to decapitate an anonymous Russian heavyweight. A huge controversy was caused by this stunt, especially when David wore a T-shirt showing a decapitated Klitschko at a press conference to promote it.

Result
Klitschko won with a unanimous points victory (118–108, 117–109, 116–110), successfully defending the IBF, IBO, WBO and The Ring'' heavyweight titles, as well as winning the WBA (Super) heavyweight title. The fight was similar to Klitschko's 2008 win against Sultan Ibragimov with Wladimir winning nearly every round, most were won only by his jab and only occasionally unleashing his right hand on his opponent. Haye won only two rounds because he managed to out punch Wladimir in rounds 3 and 12 but was unable to keep it up to win more rounds, or catch Wladimir on the chin. Neither fighter seemed to want to trade punches but Klitschko was content with that and utilized his jab to keep Haye at a comfortable distance.

Aftermath
Both Klitschko and Haye reportedly earned $32 million each for the bout. Haye revealed afterwards that he had a broken toe on his right foot, and claimed that it had hindered his game plan for the fight as he felt he was unable to jump out at Klitschko like he had previously in his career. Haye was subject to much derision and ridicule from within the boxing community and fans after citing his toe as part of the reason why he lost. Despite this Klitschko claims that Haye was unable to fight because he was just too good for him.

On 6 October, Klitschko announced his next fight. It was originally to be on 10 December 2011 against the former cruiserweight champion, French Jean-Marc Mormeck. The fight would have had taken place at Esprit Arena, Düsseldorf.
It was to be Wladimir's first title defense of the WBA (Super) belt he had won against Haye.
However, on 5 December, the fight was cancelled because Wladimir checked into a hospital to have a kidney stone removed. After the removal operation he suffered from fever and inflammation.
The fight was rescheduled for 3 March 2012.

On 13 October, Haye announced his retirement from boxing. He stuck to his plans, as he before had said that he would not box after his 31st birthday.
However, Vitali Klitschko was in negotiations for a possible bout with former WBA Heavyweight title holder Haye on March 3, 2012.

Haye came out of retirement to fight Derek Chisora in a bout sanctioned by the Luxembourg Boxing Federation in London on 14 July 2012, Haye defeated Chisora by knockout in the 5th Round.

Meanwhile, Klitschko, after beating Haye, went on to achieve another 8 successful defences of his titles until his defeat by Tyson Fury in November 2015.

International broadcasting

References

External links
Klitschko vs. Haye Official Fight Card from BoxRec

World Boxing Association heavyweight championship matches
International Boxing Federation heavyweight championship matches
World Boxing Organization heavyweight championship matches
2011 in boxing
Boxing in Germany
Sports competitions in Hamburg
2011 in German sport
Klitschko brothers
July 2011 sports events in Europe
Boxing matches